Eugene James Keogh (August 30, 1907 – May 26, 1989) was an American lawyer and politician who served as a  member of the United States House of Representatives from New York. He served 15 terms from 1937 to 1967.

Background
Keogh was born on August 30, 1907, in Brooklyn, New York City. He graduated from New York University in 1927 and from Fordham University School of Law in 1930.

Career
He was a member of the New York State Assembly (Kings Co., 20th D.) in 1936.

He was elected as a Democrat to the 75th through the 89th United States Congresses, holding office from January 3, 1937, to January 3, 1967. He served on the House Ways and Means committee and sponsored the original legislation for the Keogh plan, a type of pension plan.  In 1947-8, he served on the Herter Committee.

He was also a member of the New York State Racing and Wagering Board from 1973 until 1976.

Death
He died on May 26, 1989, in New York City and was buried at Gate of Heaven Cemetery in Hawthorne, New York.

References

Sources

Democratic Party members of the New York State Assembly
New York University Stern School of Business alumni
Fordham University School of Law alumni
Burials at Gate of Heaven Cemetery (Hawthorne, New York)
1907 births
1989 deaths
Democratic Party members of the United States House of Representatives from New York (state)
Politicians from Brooklyn
20th-century American politicians